The 2012–13 NBL Canada season was the second season of the National Basketball League of Canada. The regular season began on Friday, November 2, 2012, when the Summerside Storm hosted the Saint John Mill Rats. The regular season ended on Saturday, March 16, 2013. The playoffs started on March 19 and ended on April 12 when the London Lightning defeated the Summerside Storm in Game 4 of their series, 87–80, winning the Finals, 3–1 and to capture the franchise's second NBL Canada title. Marvin Phillips was named the Finals MVP.

Preseason 
Following the end of the 2011-12 NBL Canada season, the NBL Canada awarded Windsor, Ontario a franchise, named the Windsor Express, for the 2012–13 season. With the addition of the Express, the NBL Canada incorporated two four-team divisions, the Central and the Atlantic.

Later in the preseason, the Quebec Kebs relocated to Laval, Quebec and were renamed the Laval Kebs. However, the Keb's ownership folded the team before the start of the 2012–13 season. The NBL Canada replaced the Kebs with a franchise in Montreal, Quebec, named the Montreal Jazz.

Draft 
The 2012 NBL Canada draft was held August 27, 2012. The Windsor Express had the first pick and selected center Robert Curtis.

Regular season 
The regular season began on November 2, 2012 with the Saint John Mill Rats taking on the Summerside Storm. The number of games played by each team was increased to 40. The regular season ended on Saturday, March 16, 2013.

Standings

Overall

By division 

Notes
x – Clinched playoff spot
y – Clinched division title

Statistics leaders

Individual statistic leaders

Awards

Yearly awards 
Most Valuable Player: Devin Sweetney, Moncton Miracles
Canadian Player of the Year: Joey Haywood, Halifax Rainmen
Defensive Player of the Year: Al Stewart, Summerside Storm
Rookie of the Year: Isaac Butts, Moncton Miracles
Sixth Man of the Year: Rodney Buford, London Lightning
Newcomer of the Year: Marvin Phillips, London Lightning
Coach of the Year: Micheal Ray Richardson, London Lightning/ Joe Salerno, Summerside Storm
Expansion Franchise of the Year: Windsor Express
Ian Fowler Executive of the Year: Kim Blanco, Moncton Miracles

All-NBL Canada First Team:
 F Brandon Robinson
 F Elvin Mims
 C Isaac Butts
 G Devin Sweetney
 G Darren Duncan

All-NBL Canada Second Team:
 F Quinnel Brown
 F Tim Ellis
 C Marvin Phillips
 G Anthony Anderson
 G Jerice Crouch

All-NBL Canada Third Team:
 F Chris Common
 G Joey Haywood
 G Al Stewart
 G Antonio Ballard
 G Nick Okorie

NBL Canada All-Canada First Team:
 F Kevin Loiselle
 F Greg Surmacz
 F Sheray Thomas
 G Joey Haywood
 G Antwi Atuahene

NBL Canada All-Canada Second Team:
 F Doug McKinney
 F Kamar Burke
 C Quincy Okolie
 G Kevin Francis
 G Papa Oppong

NBL Canada All-Defensive First Team:
 F Elvin Mims
 F Kevin Loiselle
 C Isaac Butts
 G Antonio Ballard
 G Al Stewart

NBL Canada All-Defensive Second Team:
 F Marvin Phillips
 F Jaushay Rockett
 C Jonas Pierre
 G Sylvania Watkins
 G Cavell Johnson

Source:

Players of the week 
The following players were named the NBL Canada Players of the Week.

Playoffs 
The NBL Canada Championship Playoffs began on March 19, with the top five teams going for the championship. The two division winners, along with the second place team with the next best record are given the top three seeds. The next two teams in terms of record are given the lower seeds.

The fourth and fifth seeds meet each other in the first round of the NBL Canada Playoffs. The winner of this best-of-three series goes on to meet the first seed in a best-of-five semi-finals series. Second and third seeds meet in the other semi-finals series. The winner of the two semi-finals series will meet in a final best-of-five series, known as the NBL Finals.

Wild card series 
(4) Saint John Mill Rats vs. (5) Moncton Miracles

Semifinals 
(1) London Lightning vs. (5) Moncton Miracles

(2) Summerside Storm vs. (3) Windsor Express

Finals 

(1) London Lightning vs. (2) Summerside Storm

All-Star Game 
The 2013 NBL All-Star Game will take place the weekend of April 13–14, in Saint John, New Brunswick.

Roster 

 Will not participate due to injury.
 Will not participate due to overseas commitment.

Game

References

External links 
2012–13 NBL media guide

 
National Basketball League of Canada seasons
NBL